Misanthrope is a French metal band, formed in 1988. The name of the band is taken from Molière's play Le Misanthrope, reflecting the band's very theatrical style and the influence of the French dramatist on their music and lyrics.

The band's genre is difficult to define, but could probably be best described as progressive/technical death metal, somewhere along the lines of Opeth or In Flames, with a wide array of tempo and style changes. The band also makes extensive use of keyboards, and features clean, though tormented, vocals alongside the traditional death grunt.

Misanthrope was voted best French metal band by the readers of magazines Hard'N'Heavy in 1999, and by the readers of Hard Rock Mag and Hard'N'Heavy in 2000.

Discography

Inductive Theories (demo, 1989)
Crisis of Soul (demo, 1990)
Hater of Mankind (split LP, 1991)
Variation on Inductive Theories/Kingdom of the Dark (full-length, 1993)
Miracles: Totem Taboo (full-length, 1994)
1666...Théâtre Bizarre (full-length, 1995)
Visionnaire (full-length, 1997)
Libertine Humiliations (full-length, 1998)
Misanthrope Immortel (full-length, 2000)
Recueil d'Écueils: les Épaves et Autres Oeuvres Interdites (compilation, 2000)
Sadistic Sex Daemon (full-length, 2003)
Misanthro-Thérapie (15 Années d'Analyse) (compilation, 2004)
Metal Hurlant (double full-length, 2005)
IrremeDIABLE (full-length, 2008)
Ænigma Mystica (double full-length, 2013)
Alpha X Omega (full-length, 2017)
Bâtisseur de Cathédrales: Les Fissures de l'Édifice (EP, 2020)
Misanthrope Immortel 2021 - 20th Anniversary Edition (full-length, 2021)
Les déclinistes (full-length, 2023)

Members

Current members
Phillipe De L'Argilière - vocals (1988-present), guitars (1988-1999)
Anthony Scemama - guitars/keyboards (2002-present)
Jean-Jacques Moréac - bass/keyboards (1992-present)
Gaël Feret - drums (2001-present)

Former members
Charles-Henri Moréac - guitars (1992-1994)
Jean-Baptiste Boitel - guitars/keyboards (1995-2005)
Xavier Boscher - guitars (1999-2001)
David Barrault - bass (1988-1990), drums (1990-1992)
Lionel Bolore - bass (1990-1992; died 2021)
Sebastien Castelain - drums (1988-1990)
Olivier Gaubert - drums (1993-1995)
Johansson Offhenstruh - drums (1996-1997)
Alexis Phélipot - drums (1998-2001)
Alexandre Iskandar Hasnawi - keyboards (1995-1996)
Sergio Gruz - keyboards (1997-1999)
Bénédicte Archipiade Albanhac - keyboards (2000-2001)

Timeline

External links
 
 

1988 establishments in France
French death metal musical groups
Melodic death metal musical groups
Musical groups established in 1988
Musical quartets